Cotner is a surname. Notable people with the surname include:

Charles Cotner, plaintiff in Cotner v. Henry, a US court case
June Cotner (born 1950), American author
Keoke Cotner (born 1971), American golfer

See also
Cotner College, a former religious college